Upper Pobuzhia National Nature Park is a planned national park in Ukraine, located in Khmelnytskyi Oblast, in the western part of the country.

Upper Pobuzhia is located in the upper part of the Southern Bug watershed.  The proposed park contains a variety of flora and fauna, including 19 plant species listed in the Red Book of Ukraine, 37 regional rare species and 17 animal species found in the European Red List.

Links

 Біорізноманітна Україна
 На Хмельниччині замислилися над створенням нацпарку «Верхнє Побужжя»
 На Хмельниччині встановлюють межі нового національного природного парку

References

Parks in Ukraine
National parks of Ukraine
Protected areas established in 2013
2013 establishments in Ukraine